African Volleyball Championship may refer to
 Men's African Volleyball Championship
 Women's African Volleyball Championship